Manuel Eduardo Conde Orellana (born 20 December 1956) is a Guatemalan lawyer and politician who has been a member of the Congress of Guatemala since 2016, previously, he ran as presidential candidate in the 2003 election and 2007 election. 

Conde is presidential candidate in 2023 election for the Vamos party.

References

Living people
Guatemalan politicians
20th-century Guatemalan lawyers
People from Guatemala City
Members of the Congress of Guatemala
Rafael Landívar University alumni
National Advancement Party politicians
Vamos (Guatemala) politicians
1956 births